Makana is a mountain located on northern shore of the island of Kauai, where it rises  above Limahuli Valley. 
Makana is a Hawaiian language term meaning gift or reward. It is often used as a person's name or as part of a name.
Limahuli Garden and Preserve preserves the valley below.  It was featured in the 1958 film adaptation of the musical South Pacific as Bali Hai and is known by that name .

Makana Mountain is one of only two locations where the fire-throwing ceremony, ōahi, was performed in ancient Hawaiian times.  The ōahi was a celebration of very special occasions such as the graduation of students from the hālau hula (hula school) at Kēē or the visit of an alii (high chief). On the day of the ceremony, skilled firethrowers climbed the steep cliffs to the very top of Makana Mountain laden with light, dry logs of pāpala (Charpentiera spp.) or hau (Hibiscus tiliaceus). When night fell, they set the logs afire and hurled them out over the ocean. Ridge lifts created by trade winds hitting the sheer cliff of Makana kept the firebrands aloft, soaring as far as  out to sea. The result was a night sky filled with sparks and fiery torches tracing long arcs of light.
It is sometimes called "Fireworks Cliff".

People in canoes would crowd the ocean below Makana, trying to catch the firebrands. It was considered heroic to catch the flaming embers, and those who succeeded would often mark themselves with the fire in honor of the occasion. Couples who caught the firebrands would both mark themselves in the same way, as a sign of love and commitment.

The practice ended in the 19th century, with the last ceremony having been in honor of Queen Emma.

References

Landforms of Kauai
Hawaiian words and phrases
Mountains of Hawaii